Scott Meuleman (born 17 July 1980) is an Australian cricketer. He is a right-hand opening batsman and occasional leg-break googly bowler.

Meuleman, of partial German ancestry, he is a third-generation Western Australian cricketer, with his father Robert Meuleman playing 14 first-class matches for WA between 1968/69 and 1971/72, and his grandfather Ken Meuleman playing 117 First-class matches for Western Australia and Victoria including a solitary test match.

References

External links

1980 births
Living people
Australian cricketers
Western Australia cricketers
People educated at Wesley College, Perth
Cricketers from Perth, Western Australia
Sportsmen from Western Australia
Australian people of German descent